Robert Janyns (fl. 1499 – 1506) was an English gothic architect, who was likely responsible for part of the design of the Henry VII Lady Chapel at Westminster Abbey. He should not be confused with the other Robert Janyns. He also worked at Windsor Castle, Burford church, and Richmond Palace.

References

16th-century English architects
Gothic architects
Year of death missing
Year of birth unknown